Alejandro Sergio Grandi Mathon (born 22 August 1968) is an Uruguayan retired footballer who played for a number of clubs including Cádiz CF and Liverpool (URU). He played for Club Atlético Huracán in the Argentine Primera during the Clausura 1993 tournament.

References

External links
 Statistics at FutbolXXI.com 

Uruguayan footballers
Cádiz CF players
Club Atlético Huracán footballers
C.A. Bella Vista players
Club Nacional de Football players
Montevideo Wanderers F.C. players
Liverpool F.C. (Montevideo) players
Club Atlético River Plate (Montevideo) players
Club Olimpia footballers
Expatriate footballers in Argentina
Association football goalkeepers
1968 births
Living people